Sheldon Day (born July 1, 1994) is an American football defensive end for the Minnesota Vikings of the National Football League (NFL). He played college football at Notre Dame and was drafted by the Jacksonville Jaguars in the fourth round of the 2016 NFL Draft. He has also played for the San Francisco 49ers, Indianapolis Colts, and Cleveland Browns.

Early years
Day attended Warren Central High School in Indianapolis, Indiana.

Considered a four-star recruit by Rivals.com, he was rated as the 18th best defensive tackle prospect of his class. On August 4, 2011, he committed to play college football at the University of Notre Dame.

College career
As a true freshman at Notre Dame in 2012, Day appeared in all 13 games and had 23 tackles and two sacks. As a sophomore, he played in 11 games and made eight starts. He recorded 33 tackles and a half sack. As an 11-game starter his junior year, Day had 40 tackles and one sack. Following the end of the season, Sheldon Day announced that he would return for his senior season, forgoing the 2015 NFL Draft. In his senior season, starting all 13 games, Day set a career high in tackles (45), tackles for loss (15.5) and sacks (4), earning himself second-team All-American honors by the Associated Press.

Professional career

Jacksonville Jaguars
Day was drafted by the Jacksonville Jaguars in the fourth round (103rd overall) of the 2016 NFL Draft. Day played only 126 snaps during his one and a half seasons for the Jaguars.

On November 18, 2017, Day was waived by the Jaguars.

San Francisco 49ers

On November 20, 2017, Day was claimed off waivers by the San Francisco 49ers. Familiar to defensive coordinator Robert Saleh, Day was immediately a part of the defensive line rotation.  He served as a reserve and played in six games, netting 12 solo tackles, 4 assisted tackles, and a sack. Day reached Super Bowl LIV with the 49ers, but lost 31-20 to the Kansas City Chiefs.

Indianapolis Colts
On March 26, 2020, Day signed a one-year contract with the Indianapolis Colts. He was placed on injured reserve on September 6, 2020. He was designated to return from injured reserve on September 30, and began practicing with the team again. He was activated on October 17. He was waived by the Colts on November 17, 2020.

Cleveland Browns
On December 30, 2020, Day was signed to the Cleveland Browns' practice squad. His practice squad contract with the team expired after the season on January 25, 2021. Day re-signed with the Browns on April 14, 2021. The Browns terminated Day's contract on August 31, 2021. Day was re-signed to the Browns' practice squad on September 1, 2021. Day was elevated to the Browns' active roster on October 16, 2021, and reverted back to the practice squad on October 18, 2021. Day was signed to the Browns' active roster on November 9, 2021.

On April 18, 2022, Day re-signed with the Browns. The Browns terminated Day's contract on August 16, 2022.

Minnesota Vikings
On December 14, 2022, Day was signed to the Minnesota Vikings practice squad. He was released on January 7, 2023. He signed a reserve/futures contract with the team on January 30, 2023.

References

External links
Notre Dame Fighting Irish bio

Living people
1994 births
Players of American football from Indianapolis
American football defensive tackles
Notre Dame Fighting Irish football players
Jacksonville Jaguars players
San Francisco 49ers players
Indianapolis Colts players
Cleveland Browns players
Minnesota Vikings players